Joris Note (born 1949, in Borgerhout) is a Belgian writer.

He graduated in Germanic philology and started his career a scientific assistant Algemene Literatuurwetenschap and as a teacher. Together with Walter van den Broeck and Daniel Robberechts he was for several years an editor of the magazine Heibel. He wrote articles for several newspapers and magazines.

Bibliography
 1992 - De tinnen soldaat
 1995 - Het uur van ongehoorzaamheid
 2002 - Timmerwerk
 2006 - Hoe ik mijn horloge stuksloeg

See also
 Flemish literature

Sources
 Joris Note 
 Joris Note 

1949 births
Flemish writers
Living people
People from Borgerhout